USS LST-227 was a  in the United States Navy during World War II. She was later sold to South Korean Navy as ROKS Deok Bong (LST-808).

Construction and career 
LST-227 was laid down on 10 May 1943 at Chicago Bridge and Iron Co., Quincy, Massachusetts. Launched on 21 September 1943 and commissioned on 16 October 1943.

Service in the United States 
During World War II, LST-227 was assigned to the Asiatic-Pacific theater. She took part in the occupation of Kwajalein and Majuro Atolls from 2 to 8 February 1944 and Battle of Hollandia from 12 to 28 April 1944. She participated in the Battle of Guam from 21 to 28 July 1944 and the capture and occupation of southern Palau Islands from 6 September to 14 October 1944.

In 1945, she took part in the Lingayen Gulf landings on 9 January and the Assault and occupation Battle of Okinawa from 1 April to 10 May. Throughout post-war year service, she was sent for occupation service in the Far East from 21 October to 25 November 1945 and 13 December 1945 to 13 January 1946.

LST-227 was decommissioned on 22 January 1946 and was assigned to Commander Naval Forces Far East (COMNAVFE) Shipping Control Authority for Japan (SCAJAP) from 23 January 1946 to 6 June 1950 in which she was designated Q025. She was put into the Pacific Reserve Fleet following the end of her service there and later loaned to South Korea.

She was struck from the Navy Register on 28 April 1949.

Service in South Korea 
ROKS Deok Bong was acquired by the South Korean Navy on 29 March 1955 and was commissioned on 13 September 1955.

Later in the 1970s, she was designated as LST-672.

She was decommissioned on 31 October 1989 and her fate is unknown.

Awards 
LST-227 have earned the following awards:

American Campaign Medal
Asiatic-Pacific Campaign Medal (6 battle stars)
World War II Victory Medal
Navy Occupation Service Medal (with Asia clasp)
Philippines Presidential Unit Citation 
Philippines Liberation Medal (1 award)

Citations

Sources 
 
 
 
 

World War II amphibious warfare vessels of the United States
Ships built in Seneca, Illinois
1943 ships
LST-1-class tank landing ships of the United States Navy
Ships transferred from the United States Navy to the Republic of Korea Navy